Dmitri Anatolyevich Karkov (born 10 June 1966) is a former Russian football player.

References

1966 births
Footballers from Moscow
Living people
Soviet footballers
FC Volga Nizhny Novgorod players
FC Asmaral Moscow players
Russian footballers
Russian Premier League players
FC Torpedo Miass players
Association football defenders
FC Dynamo Vologda players